Once Upon a Time is a 1966 studio album by Earl Hines, accompanied by members of the Duke Ellington orchestra.

Track listing
 "Once Upon a Time" (Johnny Hodges) – 7:57
 "Black and Tan Fantasy" (Duke Ellington, James "Bubber" Miley) – 5:13
 "Fantastic, That's You" (George Cates, Bob Thiele) – 4:13
 "Cotton Tail" (Ellington) – 3:16
 "The Blues in My Flat" (Lionel Hampton) – 8:02
 "You Can Depend on Me" (Charles Carpenter, Louis Dunlap, Earl Hines) – 5:01
 "Hash Brown" (Hodges) – 3:42

Personnel

Performance
Earl Hines - piano
Aaron Bell - double bass
Richard Davis
Jimmy Hamilton - clarinet, tenor saxophone
Pee Wee Russell - clarinet
Sonny Greer - drums
Elvin Jones
Johnny Hodges - alto saxophone
Russell Procope
Harold Ashby - tenor saxophone
Paul Gonsalves
Lawrence Brown - trombone
Buster Cooper
Cat Anderson - trumpet
Ray Nance
Clark Terry

References 

1966 albums
Earl Hines albums
Impulse! Records albums
Albums produced by Bob Thiele